Hajro Ulqinaku is an Albanian writer from Ulcinj, Montenegro.

Life 
Hajro was born on 3 May 1938 to an Albanian family in Ulcinj, Montenegro. He finished the primary and secondary school in Ulcinj and the university studies in Universiteti i Prishtinës in Pristina, Kosovo.

Works

Books for children 
 Fëmijët e detit
 Margaritarët e zinj
 Çelësi i artë
 Kolovajza e florinjtë e Hënës
 Mbrëmje pulëbardhash
 Fëmijëria në bregdet
 Gjiri i Shpresës
 Ligji i detit
 Ani, Ben, Ani
 Bukuria e detit
 Panorama e detit
 Thesari i piratëve
 Pëllumbat në antenë
 Mos qaj Kestrina
 Barka me vela
 Limani i Qetësisë
 Lulekuqet mbi banka
 Ishulli i Gjelbër
 Libri për detin 6 + 1

Dramas 
 Tërë bota Kosovë!

Scientific books 
 Deti, detarët e Ulqinit
 Detarë, peshkatarë, ulqinakë
 Detaria, detarë, dokumente
 Libri për Ulqinin dhe ulqinakët
 Glosar
 Thesar popullor

Notes

1938 births
People from Ulcinj
Living people
Albanians in Montenegro
University of Pristina alumni
Albanian male writers
20th-century Albanian writers
21st-century Albanian writers
Montenegrin writers
Montenegrin male writers
Yugoslav writers
20th-century male writers